The Gallup Herald was a newspaper in Gallup, New Mexico, USA covering local news, sports, business, jobs, and community events. The paper began publication in 2004 and ceased publication in 2012. Its list price was 75 cents. It was published weekly on Wednesdays.

References 

Newspapers published in New Mexico